Catherine Van Rensselaer Schuyler ;, also known as "Kitty", (November 10, 1734 – March 7, 1803) was a Colonial and post-Colonial American socialite and the matriarch of the prominent colonial Schuyler family as wife of Philip Schuyler.

Early life
Kitty was born in 1734 to Col. Johannes Van Rensselaer (1708–1783), called the "Patroon of Greenbush," and Engeltie "Angelica" Livingston (1698–1747).  As a child, she was known as "The Morning Star."  Due to her family's social position, she was a part of the society of Albany and, once a year, would visit relatives in order to acquire "the polish of fashionable society" by being at the Court of the Royal Governor of New York."

Her paternal great-grandfather was Hendrick van Rensselaer and her 2x great-grandfather was Kiliaen Van Rensselaer, one of the original founders of the Dutch colony, New Amsterdam.  Her maternal grandparents were Robert Livingston the Younger (1663–1725) and Margarita Schuyler (b. 1682), the daughter of Pieter Schuyler (1657–1724), the first mayor of Albany.

Life
Kitty was once described as "a lady of great beauty, shape and gentility" and was subject to a number of suitors in the future.

Kitty's husband, Philip Schuyler, was known as a man of great wealth and intelligence as he commanded a militia in the French and Indian War and still managed to assume ownership of the large estate given to him by his father. Kitty was known as "a capable wife, mother..., and manager of the extensive Schuyler household of servants, slaves, and hired hands."

Personal life

On September 17, 1755, Catherine was married to Philip Schuyler at the Albany Dutch Church.  Philip was the son of Cornelia Van Cortlandt (1698–1762) and Mayor Johannes Schuyler Jr. (1697–1741), the third generation of the Dutch family in America.  Together, Philip and Catherine had 15 children, eight of whom survived to adulthood, including:

 Angelica Schuyler (1756–1814), who married John Barker Church (1748–1818), later a British MP.
 Elizabeth Schuyler (1757–1854), who married Alexander Hamilton (1755/7–1804), later the first Secretary of the Treasury. Elizabeth co-founded the first orphanage in New York City. 
 Margarita "Peggy" Schuyler (1758–1801), who married Stephen Van Rensselaer III (1764–1839), 8th Patroon. 
 Cornelia (1761–1762).
 John Bradstreet Schuyler Twin to Cornelia (1761–1761).
 John Bradstreet Schuyler (1763–1764).
 John Bradstreet Schuyler (1765–1795), who married Elizabeth Van Rensselaer (1768–1841), the sister of Stephen Van Rensselaer III who married his sister Peggy. 
 Philip Jeremiah Schuyler (1768–1835), who married first, Sarah Rutsen (d. 1805), and after her death, Mary Anna Sawyer. Philip served in the U.S. House of Representatives.
 Triplets (1770–1770, Unbaptized).
 Rensselaer Schuyler (1773–1847), who married Elizabeth Ten Broeck, daughter of General Abraham Ten Broeck.
 Cornelia Schuyler (1776–1808), who married Washington Morton.
 Cortlandt Schuyler (1778–1778).
 Catherine Van Rensselaer Schuyler (1781–1857), who married first, Samuel Malcolm (son of William Malcolm), and then James Cochran (1769–1848), her cousin and the son of John Cochran and Gertrude Schuyler, Philip Schuyler's sister.

Catherine died of a stroke in March 1803 at the age of 68.

References

External links

 Catherine Schuyler a novel by Mary Gay Humphreys, 1897
 
 Catherine Van Rensselaer Schuyler at the New York State Museum
 Schuyler, Catherine Van Rensselaer at Encyclopedia.com
 Portrait of Mrs. Philip John Schuyler (1734-1803) at the New-York Historical Society
 Letter from Alexander Hamilton to Elizabeth Van Rensselaer Schuyler, dated April 14, 1780 regarding his engagement to her daughter.

1734 births
1803 deaths
Catherine
Catherine Van Rensselaer
Catherine Van Rensselaer Schuyler